Richard Seymour Hall  (22 July 1925 – 14 November 1997) was a British journalist and historian, writing primarily about  Africa.

He was born in Margate, and spent several years of his childhood in Australia. On returning to the UK with his mother after his parents separated he attended Hastings Grammar School. After a short period working as a junior reporter on local newspapers he enlisted and served as a signaler in the Royal Navy. After WW2 he obtained a place at Oxford University and received an honours degree from  Keble College, Oxford. During this time he married Barbara Hall.

He worked first on Fleet Street for the Daily Mail, and then went to Northern Rhodesia where  he was co-founder and editor of the African Mail (also known as the Central African Mail) with Alexander Scott. 

Throughout the 1950s and 1960s he remained at the centre of the de-colonisation process in Zambia, with friendships that included Kenneth Kaunda, who became first president of Zambia. Following Zambia's independence in 1964 he became  editor of the Times of Zambia a newspaper owned by Tiny Rowland.  

In 1967 he returned to England as African correspondent of The Observer, including reporting on the Biafran war. He later became editor of the Observer Magazine, and during that time was a proponent of an ultimately unsuccessful fight for greater journalistic independence from its owners. During the early 1980s he worked as a senior columnist for the Financial Times.  In 1986 he founded his own financial and political bulletin Africa Analysis.

He remained active both as editor of Africa Analysis and as an author until his death in 1997. Richard Hall married twice, first to Barbara Hall, a successful journalist and author in her own right and a respected crossword compiler and puzzles editor for the Sunday Times. His second marriage was to Carol Cattley, whom he met whilst working at the Observer. Richard Hall had 5 sons from his first marriage.

Books 

He wrote a number of books on Africa politics, history, and biography, for adults and children.

For adults 

Empires of the Monsoon:  A History of the Indian Ocean and its Invaders, HarperCollins 1998. 
Chinese translation:  季风帝国 印度洋及其入侵者的历史, Gingko (Beijing) Ltd, 2018.  
My Life with Tiny: A Biography of Tiny Rowland, Faber and Faber, 1987. 
Lovers on the Nile: The Incredible African Journeys of Sam and Florence Baker, Random House, 1980.  
Spanish translation, Los Amantes del Nilo 
(with Hugh Peyman) The Great Uhuru Railway: China's Showpiece in Africa, Gollancz, 1976.  
Zambia 1890-1964: The Colonial period,  1976.  
Stanley: An Adventurer Explored, Houghton Mifflin, 1975. . According to WorldCat, the book is held in 1312 libraries
Japanese translation by Kiyotaka Yoneda, 栄光と幻想 : 探検家スタンレー伝 / Eikō to gensō, 
The High Price of Principles: Kaunda and the White South, 1969,  Holmes & Meier. 
Zambia, Praeger, 1966, 357 pages,

For young people 

Explorers in Africa. Usborne Publishing, 1975,  
Discovery of Africa Hamlyn  1970,  
Also published in French as Decouverte de l'afrique
Kaunda, founder of Zambia. Longmans, 1967.

References

External links 
Richard Seymour Hall website
Richard Hall archives held at the University of London

1925 births
1997 deaths
British male journalists
People educated at Hastings Grammar School
Alumni of Keble College, Oxford
Daily Mail journalists
The Observer people
People from Margate
20th-century British historians
British expatriates in Australia
British expatriates in Zambia